Răzvan Ion (/Rəzvan Ion/) is known for creating the first artificial intelligence curator in the history of art. He is a theoretician, curator and futurist, speaker on new technologies & arts, and creator & manager of new art spaces.

Career 
Ion was an associate professor and lecturer at the University of California, Berkeley; Hochschule für Musik und Theater München; University of Vienna; Lisbon University; Central University of New York; University of London; Sofia University; University of Kyiv; University of Bucharest etc. where he taught Curatorial Studies and Critical Thinking. He has held conferences and lectures at different art institutions like Witte de With, Rotterdam; Kunsthalle Vienna; Art in General, New York; Calouste Gulbenkian, Lisbon; Casa Encedida, Madrid. He is the co-founder of Deraffe Vienna, Bucharest Biennale - International Biennial for Contemporary Art, Pavilion - art centre and Pavilion Journal - an academic journal. As an artist he exhibited between 2000 -2010 in Poznan Biennial, SKC Gallery- Belgrade, National Museum of Art – Cluj, ICA – Bucharest, NY Experimental Festival, InterFACES – Bangkok, Centro Cultural del Matadero – Madrid, International Photo Ljubljana, Going Public - Milano, CCA Ekaterinburg, National Museum of Art – Timișoara, ICA Budapest, New Langton – San Francisco. Recently he was the curator of Bucharest Biennale 8, together with Beral Madra. Was the chief curator of creart Gallery Bucharest between 2017 and 2020. He is a speaker on new technologies, AI, machine learning, blockchain & art. In 2020 he founded Deraffe Vienna, an organization working at the intersection between art and new technologies such as AI, XR, and blockchain.

As a curator, director and founder of different institutions he worked with artists like Erwin Wurm, Jan Kaila, Yoko Ono, AES+F, Aga Ousseinov, and Naeem Mohaiemen, Sabrina Gschwandtner, Minerva Cuevas, Mona Hatoum, Asier Mendizabal and many others.

He founded Gay45, the first indie queer European magazine.

He was a speaker on technology and arts for Istyle, Apple, MindChain, Business Review, etc.

The latest exhibitions curated by him were: Wie wir Dinge betrachten - for European Union Council Presidency of Austria, Bucharest Biennale - Edit Your Future, From Contemplating To Constructing Situations (group show with Francis Alys, Minerva Cuevas, Wilfredo Prieto, Erwin Wurm) at Pavilion Center.

He wrote texts for general and academic publications like Mahkuscript, New York Art Review, Reforma, and Pavilion.

He was also a tenured professor at the University of Bucharest where he taught a course on curatorial studies & critical thinking.

Notable works 
 Visual Witness (2002)
 Architectural Economy of a Biennial (2012)
 Edit Your Future (2021)

References 

National Austrian Radio & TV

Mahkuscript

Kurier

Le Monde

The Art Newspaper

Artforum

Pavilion Journal

Pavilion - journal for politics & culture

Artnet

Art and Education

 Mahkuscript
 The Art Newspaper
 Spinnwerk

Living people
Year of birth missing (living people)
Romanian art curators